Galactia elliottii, commonly known as Elliott's milkpea or white milkpea, is a species of flowering plant found in the south-eastern United States, a member of the family Fabaceae.

It is native to Florida, Georgia and South Carolina. It is a dicot.

References

Phaseoleae